CCN may refer to:

In science and technology 
 Cement chemist notation, developed to simplify the formulas used by cement chemists
 Cereal cyst nematode, a plant disease 
 Corn cyst nematode, a plant disease
 Cerebrocortical necrosis, a nutritional brain disease of cattle
 Cloud condensation nuclei
 Content centric networking, approach to computer-networking architecture
 Controlled-Controlled Not Gate (also known as a Toffoli gate), a component of a reversible computer
Cyclomatic Complexity Number, a software metric
CYR61, CTGF, NOV, the first three proteins identified that belong to the "CCN" protein family - also see CCN intercellular signaling protein
Critical care nursing

Organizations 
 Camino Cristiano Nicaragüense, a Nicaraguan political party
 Caribbean Communications Network Ltd., a unit of ONE Caribbean Media Ltd. based in Trinidad and Tobago
 Chebucto Community Net in Halifax, Nova Scotia
 City College Norwich, a further education college in the United Kingdom
 Commission de la capitale nationale, Canadian Crown Corporation, known in English as the National Capital Commission, administrating federal properties in the region around Ottawa, Ontario and Gatineau/Hull, QC
 Companhia Colonial de Navegação, a former Portuguese shipping company
 Council of Churches in Namibia, an organization representing Christian churches in Namibia
 County Councils Network, the network of County Councils in England
 Covering Climate Now, a consortium of news organizations for news coverage of climate change

Other uses 
 Comedy Central News, a TV show on the Dutch Comedy Central
 Concours Complet National, a national eventing competition (see Concours Complet International)
 Certified Clinical Nutritionist, see Nutrition